Adriana Ferrarese del Bene ( in Ferrara – after 1804 in Venice) was an Italian operatic soprano.

She has been known under a variety of names. The 1979 edition of the Concise Oxford Dictionary of Opera lists her as born Adriana Gabrieli and later known as La Ferrarese (presumably from the city of her birth). However, Grove Dictionary of Music and Musicians notes  that her identification with a Francesca Gabrielli,  ("nicknamed the Ferrarese one"), whom Charles Burney heard in Venice in 1770 is not based on solid evidence. What is known is that she married Luigi del Bene in 1782 and performed thereafter as Adriana Ferrarese (or Ferraresi) del Bene.

Ferrarese del Bene studied in Venice and performed in London (1785–1787) before arriving in Vienna, where she made her reputation singing serious roles in opera buffa (1788–1791). 
The publication  reported, "She has, in addition to an unbelievable high register, a striking low register and connoisseurs of music claim that in living memory no such voice has sounded within Vienna's walls."

Performance of Mozart 
Aware of her tendency to drop her chin and throw back her head while singing low and high notes respectively, Mozart chose to fill her showpiece aria ("") with continuous harmonic leaps to force her to bob her head "like a chicken".

References

Italian operatic sopranos
1755 births
1800s deaths
Musicians from Ferrara
18th-century Italian women opera singers
Wolfgang Amadeus Mozart's singers